Mochokus brevis is a species of upside-down catfish native to the Nile and Chad Basins. This species grows to a length of  TL.

References

 

Mochokidae
Catfish of Africa
Fish of Cameroon
Fish of Chad
Fish of Egypt
Freshwater fish of West Africa
Fish of Sudan
Fish described in 1906